Raúl Astor (January 10, 1925 – June 22, 1995), born Raúl Ignacio Spangenberg Parera, was an Argentine-born Mexican actor, director, producer and announcer.

Personal life
On Christmas Day 1955, he was married with actress Chela Castro, and never had children.

Filmography

References

External links

1925 births
1995 deaths
Male actors from Buenos Aires
Mexican male telenovela actors
Mexican male television actors
Mexican film producers
Mexican telenovela directors
Mexican male screenwriters
20th-century Mexican male actors
Naturalized citizens of Mexico
Argentine emigrants to Mexico
20th-century Mexican screenwriters
20th-century Mexican male writers